In the 1994–95 Qatar Stars League, Al-Rayyan Sports Club won the championship.

References
Qatar - List of final tables (RSSSF)

1994–95 in Asian association football leagues
1994–95 in Qatari football